The Adoration of the Magi is a painting of c.1632 to 1633 recently attributed to Rembrandt.

It was discovered in 2016 after it fell off the wall at the home of its owners in Rome. They took it to be restored as the fall damaged the frame. The restorer realized the painting was not a copy as the owners believed, but an original. The French Academy in Rome confirmed its authenticity on June 22, 2021. The French Academy in Rome, supported by the Fondazione Patrimonio Italia (FPI), displayed the work at a symposium titled "Rembrandt: Identifying the Prototype, Seeing the Invisible" at its Villa Medici headquarters. The work was thought to have been lost and has been known only from copies in the Hermitage Museum and the Gothenburg Art Museum.

The work is oil on paper applied to canvas. It measures 54 centimeters by 44 centimeters. It was likely painted in preparation for a series of engravings on the Life and Passion of Christ.

References

Paintings by Rembrandt
Rembrandt
1630s paintings